MediaTransparency was a project begun in 1999 which monitored the financial ties of conservative think tanks to conservative foundations in the United States.  Its database tracked over 50,000 grants awarded since 1985, which total more than US$3.2 billion.  It was run by Cursor, Inc. before being acquired by Media Matters for America in 2008.

Cursor.org was dedicated to "news, opinion, analysis and investigative data related to links between conservative philanthropies and the organizations and people they fund, and their influence in the media."

References

American political websites